Daniel Boone is a four-part television series that aired on Walt Disney Presents on ABC. Two episodes aired in December 1960 and two others in March 1961.

The miniseries was loosely based on Kentucky pioneer Daniel Boone. It starred Dewey Martin as Boone and Mala Rudolph as his wife, Rebecca. (The actress who played Rebecca Boone is listed as Mala Powers in two reference books: Douglas Brode's Shooting Stars of the Small Screen: Encyclopedia of TV Western Actors, 1946–Present and Vincent Terrace's Encyclopedia of Television Shows, 1925 through 2010.)

References

American Broadcasting Company original programming
1960 American television series debuts
1961 American television series endings
Period family drama television series
Television shows set in Kentucky
Television shows set in North Carolina